Proglumetacin (usually as the maleate salt, trade names Afloxan, Protaxon and Proxil) is a nonsteroidal anti-inflammatory drug (NSAID). It is metabolized in the body to indometacin and proglumide, a drug with antisecretory effects that helps prevent injury to the stomach lining.

References

Nonsteroidal anti-inflammatory drugs
Prodrugs
Indole ethers at the benzene ring
Piperazines
Carboxylate esters
Benzamides